Nate Perry is an American rock bass player and songwriter. He grew up in Northern California and has been based in Los Angeles since 1999 where he has performed, toured and recorded with several artists including CSS, Manic, Middle Class Rut, Jesse Spencer of the Fox show House, Fractional Importance, Stars Align, Art of Chaos, and Toadies guitarist Darrel Herbert. Nate currently produces concerts and special events for Live Nation Entertainment.

Career File
Nate Perry began his professional music career at 19 as a production bassist on cruise ships while pursuing a B.A. in music from Humboldt State University & The University of Memphis, where he appeared with The Memphis Symphony. Shortly after relocating to Los Angeles, he joined Fractional Importance who released three records independently; including Visions, recorded by Don Kazarinoff (Incubus). Fractional gained regional popularity, opening for such bands as System of a Down, Alien Ant Farm, Smile Empty Soul and Seether, before eventually breaking up in 2004.

In 2006, Perry briefly played in pop/rock band Stars Align(formerly Neve). Following a performance at The Troubadour, the band caught the interest of guitarist Joe Don Rooney of Rascal Flatts fame who went on to work with the group. They released a self-titled EP in 2009, produced by Rooney, which featured Perry on bass guitar.

Dissatisfied with the band's Hot AC musical aspirations, Perry left Stars Align in 2007 to join experimental rock group Manic. The band released their debut EP, Floorboards on Geffen Records, which led to appearances at SXSW '07 as well as regional touring, including a residency at famed L.A. venue The Echo. Their second EP, Another New Home,  featured writing by Perry; including the track Carolina Ghost which received airplay on the now defunct Indie 103.1. The song was later remixed by Joel Petersen of The Faint and released as a limited edition 7" vinyl on Suretone Records. Although the band's efforts received favorable press, drawing comparisons to Pink Floyd & Radiohead, they fell short of major label sales expectations and disbanded in late 2008.

Nate performed with various L.A. based artists from 2008-2010 including former Toadies guitarist Darrel Herbert and Dwight Yoakam drummer, Mitch Marine. The trio recorded under the moniker DWH and later, No Tomorrow, self-releasing an EP in 2010. Perry also played locally with actor Jesse Spencer, known for his role on the hit show House, M.D., alongside singer Julian Sakata under the name The Ruby Fakes. In 2011 he received an M.M. from Cal State L.A. in Commercial Music where he taught as a graduate assistant.

In the fall of 2011, Perry was recruited by Brazilian Sub Pop band CSS to be their touring bassist, following the departure of original member Adriano Cintra. Nate performed extensively with the band on tours of North America, Australia and Japan in support of their third studio album, La Liberación. During this period, the band appeared at the 2011 Falls Festival in Australia alongside Fleet Foxes and Group Love, as well as at the Corona Capital Festival in Mexico City, with The Strokes and Moby. The group was especially well received in Japan, selling out famed Tokyo venue Studio Coast. Perry continued to tour with CSS throughout 2012, doing small tours and one-off performances throughout California and the Southwest.

In 2012, Perry performed and recorded several bass tracks on the sophomore Middle Class Rut LP, Pick Up Your Head, released June 2013 on Bright Antenna Records.

Discography

With Middle Class Rut

 Pick Up Your Head (2013)

With DWH

 EP (2010)

With Manic

 A Strange Audience (2008)
 Floorboards (2007)
 Another New Home (2007)
 Carolina Ghost - Broken Spindles 7-inch (2007)

With Stars Align

 Self Titled EP (2009)

With Fractional Importance

 Popstar Guitar - EA Games/PS3 Game (2008)
 A Love Letter Suicide (2004)
 Visions (2001)

With Hermetic Science

 A Hermetic Science Primer (2009)
 Prophesies'' (1998)

External links
 Nate Perry Official Website
 Nate Perry YouTube Channel
 Nate Perry Twitter

References

Guitarists from California
American rock bass guitarists
American male bass guitarists
Living people
Year of birth missing (living people)